Ion Ungureanu (2 August 1935 – 28 January 2017) was a Moldovan actor and politician.

Biography 
Born in Opaci, Ungureanu served as member of the Parliament of Moldova. As an MP, he was Minister of Culture of Moldova from 1990 to 1994. He was also a leader of the Democratic Forum of Romanians in Moldova.

Ungureanu died on 28 January 2017 in Bucharest at the age of 81.

Filmography

References

External links 

 Cine au fost şi ce fac deputaţii primului Parlament din R. Moldova (1990-1994)?
 Declaraţia deputaţilor din primul Parlament
 Site-ul Parlamentului Republicii Moldova

1935 births
2017 deaths
Romanian people of Moldovan descent
Moldovan male film actors
Moldovan MPs 1990–1994
Popular Front of Moldova MPs
Moldova
Moldovan actor-politicians

Recipients of the Order of Honour (Moldova)